Ikuro Takahashi (高橋幾郎 Takahashi Ikuro in Japanese) (born in 1957, Kamisunagawa, Hokkaido) is a drummer and percussionist based in Sapporo, also plays electronic and oscillators. He has been a central member of many groups from the Tokyo psychedelic underground from the early eighties. Some of the groups he has played with include Fushitsusha, High Rise, Kousokuya, Maher Shalal Hash Baz,  Ché-SHIZU, Nagisa ni te, LSD March, Gu-N, and Akebonoizu, Tetsuya Umeda and Fumio Kosakai of Incapacitants. He has performed under the name Anoyondekigoto since 2000, a unit project with a Butoh dancer Yoko Muronoi(1959- 2017).  He runs his own label Galleria Zarigania since 2007.

Discography

Fushitsusha
 2012  Mabushii Itazura na Inori  (CD, Heartfast)
 2012  Hikari To Nazukeyou  (CD, Heartfast)
 1998  A little longer thus (CD, Tokuma)
 1998  The Wisdom Prepared  (CD, Tokuma)
 1998  Withdrawe, this sable disclosure 'ere devot'd (CD, Les Disques Victo)
 1998  I saw it! that which before I could only sense (2CD Paratactile)

LSD March
 2003  Totsuzen honno no gotoku LP  (White Elephant)
 2005  Domori to sanshu CD (Siwa)
 2005  Kanashimino bishonen LP (HP Cycle)
 2005  Shindara jigoku LP (Siwa)

Kousokuya
 1991  Kousokuya LP  (Ray Night Music, 1991; CD reissue, PSF 2003)
 1995  Ray Night 1991-1992 Live CD  (Forced Exposure)
 2004  Live Gyakuryu Kokuu CD  (PSF)

Maher Shalal Hash Baz
 1991  Maher Goes to Gothic Country LP (Org)
 1996  Return Visit to Rock Mass 3LP/3CD  (Org)

Che-SHIZU
 1997  Live 1996 Suisho CD (PSF)
 1999  Glimmering Star LP (Aleutian Retto)

Aihiyo
 1998  Aihiyo CD  (Tokuma)
 2000  Live CD  (PSF)

Other
 1975-1977 as Seishokki (LP Siwa 2005)
 1984  with High Rise (LP, PSF)
 1993  untitled with Reiko A (Cassette NekoIsis)
 1995  Gu-N with Gu-N (CD, Pataphysique)
 1997  Live Performance 1992/1994 with Tamio Shiraishi (CD, Pataphysique)
 1997  Of Dogstarman with Fumio Kosakai (CD, Pataphysique)
 2004  Anoyo no dekigoto (LP, Siwa)
 2008  Moere with Umeda Tetsuya (CD, Majikick Records)
 2017  with Eddie Marcon,  Strobo / Koshin (7inch Single, Pong-Kong Records)

References

Interview. etcetera, issue 1, 1996. unpaginated. (Japanese)

External links
Official site 
discogs
Galleria Zarigania discogs
Galleria Zarigania
twitter
Live in Sapporo on 14 Dec 2013

High Rise (band) members
Takahashi,Ikuro
Living people
Place of birth missing (living people)
Musicians from Tokyo
1957 births
People from Hokkaido